The Noosa Tigers Australian Football Club is an Australian rules football club on the Sunshine Coast, Queensland. The club emblem is the tiger and the club plays in the QAFL. Noosa Tigers are current QAFL 2022 Finalist. 2020 saw the introduction of Noosa's first AFLW team, who finished premiers in Queensland Football Association Div 2. 2021 marks the inception of the Noosa Tigers into the QAFL seniors and reserves competition.

Season Results
(since 2011):

Honours
 QFA
 Premiers (11): 1973, 1975, 1976, 1977, 1980, 1981, 1985, 2010, 2011, 2019, 2020
 Runners Up (10): 1970, 1972, 1979, 1982, 1984, 1987, 1989, 1994, 2017, 2018

 QFA Div 2 Womens
 Premiers (1): 2020

External links
Official site

Queensland State Football League clubs